Myrtillocactus geometrizans (bilberry cactus, whortleberry cactus or blue candle) is a species of cactus in the genus Myrtillocactus, native to central and northern Mexico.

Description
Myrtillocactus geometrizans is a large shrubby cactus growing to 4–5 m tall, with candelabra-like branching on mature plants. The individual stems are 6–10 cm diameter, with five (occasionally six) ribs, with areoles spaced 1.5–3 cm apart. The flowers are creamy white, 2–2.5 cm diameter. The fruit is an edible dark purple berry 1–2 cm diameter, superficially resembling Vaccinium myrtillus (bilberry or whortleberry) fruit; both the scientific and English names derive from this resemblance.

Cultivation
It is a popular species in cultivation, where young plants commonly remain unbranched for many years. The fruit is edible, and sold for consumption in Mexico.

The bilberry cactus is fast growing, and is often used as grafting stock because of this. With favourable conditions it can reach heights of up to 15 feet.

The fukurokuryuzinboku(福禄竜神木) cultivar from Japan, commonly known as "titty cactus" or "breast cactus," has unusually plump ribs shaped like human breasts. Fukurokuryuzinboku, roughly translates to fortune (fuku), fief/happy (roku), dragon (ryu), Shinto god/spirit (jin), tree (boku). It was named after Fukurokuju and Ryujin, two of the Seven Lucky Gods in Japanese mythology.

References

geometrizans
Cacti of Mexico
Flora of Northwestern Mexico
Flora of Northeastern Mexico
Garden plants of North America
Drought-tolerant plants